Nikoloz Gelashvili (born 5 August 1985) is a Georgian footballer who plays for FC Dila Gori.

Career
Gelashvili joined Zestaponi in January 2008.

Flamurtari

In June 2014 Gelashvili left Qarabağ after one season with the club, and signed a one-year contract, with the option of another year, with Flamurtari Vlorë.

He debuted with Flamurtari on 23 August 2014 in week one of 2014–15 Albanian Superliga where he come as substitute in place of Nijaz Lena during a 2–1 win over Teuta Durrës. He scored his first goal with club on 10 September in a 3–0 success over Apolonia. He scored his second goal on 20 September in a 2–0 away win against KF Elbasani.

Pafos & Dinamo Tbilisi 
In July 2015 Gelashvili signed with Pafos. After half season he moved to Dinamo Tbilisi.

International career 

Gelashvili made his national team debut on 16 November 2007 against Qatar, which he was call-up to both matches in November. He played another match on 9 September 2009. On 10 October 2009, he played his first 2010 FIFA World Cup qualification.

On 14 October 2014, after seven years as international footballer, Gelashvili scored his first ever goal with Georgia during a 3–0 win away against Gibraltar, match valid for Group D of UEFA Euro 2016 qualifying.

International goals
Scores and results list Georgia's goal tally first.

Honours 

Dinamo Tbilisi:
Georgian League 1
 2015–16
Georgian Cup 2
 2014–15, 2015–16

Zestafoni:
Georgian League 1
 2010–11
Georgian Super Cup
 Runner-up (1): 2008–09

Wit Georgia:
Georgian League 
 Runner-up (2): 2005–06, 2007–08
Georgian Super Cup 1
 2008–09

Qarabağ
Azerbaijan Premier League: 1
 2013–14

Flamurtari Vlorë:
Albanian Supercup
 Runner-up (1): 2014–15

Statistics

References

External links
 
 
 
 

1985 births
Living people
Footballers from Georgia (country)
Georgia (country) international footballers
Georgia (country) under-21 international footballers
Expatriate footballers from Georgia (country)
Association football forwards
FC Kakheti Telavi players
FC WIT Georgia players
FC Zestafoni players
VfL Bochum players
VfL Bochum II players
Qarabağ FK players
Flamurtari Vlorë players
Pafos FC players
Erovnuli Liga players
2. Bundesliga players
Kategoria Superiore players
Cypriot First Division players
Expatriate footballers in Germany
Expatriate footballers in Albania
Expatriate footballers in Azerbaijan
Expatriate footballers in Cyprus
FC Dinamo Tbilisi players
Expatriate sportspeople from Georgia (country) in Azerbaijan